Johannes Letzner (29 November 1531 – 16 February 1613) was a Renaissance-era German Protestant priest and historian of Lower Saxony, in particular of Brunswick-Lüneburg.

Letzner studied briefly at Wittenberg University in 1550–1551 before moving to Uslar as cantor and school master, and later as vicar to  Parensen (1553)  Langenholtensen (1564),  Lüthorst (1583), Iber (1589) and finally to  Strodthagen where he retired in 1610  and died three years later.

Letzner's works were widely perused in 18th-century historiography of Germany, but they are now considered highly unreliable. 
His magnum opus was going to be a "Great Chronicle of Brunswick-Lüneburg" ("Große Braunschweig-Lüneburg-Göttingensche Chronika")  in eight volumes, on which he worked during 36 years of his life. This work was never printed in full, but the fifteen works Letzner published in print during his lifetime can be seen as portions of this work.

Conradus Fontanus is one of the purported sources used by Letzner, allegedly a medieval chronicler with a floruit close to 1200. Fontanus was included by Adelung in his continuation of Jöcher's Gelehrten-Lexicon,  but in 20th century scholarship has come to be considered as of dubious historicity, or spurious. He is also the author of a Historia S. Bonifacii, a publication likewise criticized for fanciful inventions concerning local histories (he claims that at the Hülfensberg Saint Boniface destroyed the supposed Germanic god Stuffo), even for the invention of sources.

Bibliography 
1590, Corbeische Chronica (history of Corvey Abbey) 
1594,  Stammbuch oder Chronik Des Uralten Adelichen und Gedenkwürdigen Geschlechts Der „von Berlepsch“ ( history of the von Berlepsch noble family)
1596, Dasselische und Einbeckische Chronica (chronicle of Dassel and Einbeck)
1603, Historia Caroli Magni. Des Grossmechtigsten, Christlichen Roemischen und ersten Teutschen Keysers … Taten. (history of Charlemagne), printed by Andream Hantzsch at Hildeßheim.
1604, Ioannis Letzneri Chronica: und historische Beschreibung des Lebens, der Haendel und Thaten des teutsch. Röm. Keysers Ludovici Pii, und wie derselbe ... Corbei ... gestifftet samt angehengter Beschreibung der dreissig adelichen Geschlechter
 Chronica und historische Beschreibung des löblichen und weltberümbten keyserlichen freien Stiffts und Closters Walckenrieth (history of Walkenried Abbey)
 Hardessische Chronica (chronicle of Hardegsen)

References

 
  Hans Klinge Johannes Letzner. Ein niedersächsischer Chronist des 16. Jahrhunderts Niedersächsisches Jahrbuch für Landesgeschichte 52 1952  36-96
 Dieter Lent: Letzner, Johannes. In: Horst-Rüdiger Jarck, Dieter Lent u. a. (Hrsg.): Braunschweigisches Biographisches Lexikon: 8. bis 18. Jahrhundert. Appelhans, Braunschweig 2006, S. 437f.
 
 
  Hans Klinge Johannes Letzner. Ein niedersächsischer Chronist des 16. Jahrhunderts Göttingen  Jahr=1951
  Ludwig Simon, Johannes Letzenerus, Hardessianus. Zum 350. Todestag des Chronisten Johannes Letzner Northeimer Heimatblätter 1  1963

16th-century German historians
Clergy from Lower Saxony
1531 births
1613 deaths
German male non-fiction writers
17th-century German historians